The 1988 United States presidential election in Utah took place on November 8, 1988. All fifty states and the District of Columbia, were part of the 1988 United States presidential election. State voters chose five electors to the Electoral College, which selected the president and vice president.

Utah was won by incumbent United States Vice President George H. W. Bush of Texas, who was running against Massachusetts Governor Michael Dukakis. Bush ran with Indiana Senator Dan Quayle as Vice President, and Dukakis ran with Texas Senator Lloyd Bentsen.

Utah weighed in for this election as 26% more Republican than the national average. The presidential election of 1988 was a very partisan election for Utah, with over 98 percent of the electorate voting for either the Republican or Democratic parties, though several other parties appeared on the ballot. Every county in Utah voted in majority for the Republican candidate, except for Carbon County, which voted primarily for Dukakis.

Bush won the election in Utah with a 34-point landslide – his strongest victory in the nation. He carried every county save heavily-unionized Carbon County. This was the fourth election in a row in which Utah gave the Republican nominee his highest vote share of any state in the country. Utah had voted heavily for William Jennings Bryan in 1896 and for Woodrow Wilson and Harry Truman in the two close elections of the first half of the 20th century, 1916 and 1948. However, like most of the rest of the Mountain West, Utah shifted toward the Republican Party in 1952, voting Republican in every subsequent election (as of 2020) save 1964, and voting for Johnson in 1964 by only 9.7%, amid Johnson's 22.6% national landslide.

Results

Results by county

See also
 United States presidential elections in Utah
 Presidency of George H. W. Bush

References

Utah
1988
1988 Utah elections